A blood test is a laboratory analysis performed on a blood sample that is usually extracted from a vein in the arm using a hypodermic needle, or via fingerprick. Multiple tests for specific blood components, such as a glucose test or a cholesterol test, are often grouped together into one test panel called a blood panel or blood work. Blood tests are often used in health care to determine physiological and biochemical states, such as disease, mineral content, pharmaceutical drug effectiveness, and organ function. Typical clinical blood panels include a basic metabolic panel or a complete blood count. Blood tests are also used in drug tests to detect drug abuse.

Extraction

A venipuncture is useful as it is a minimally invasive way to obtain cells and extracellular fluid (plasma) from the body for analysis. Blood flows throughout the body, acting as a medium that provides oxygen and nutrients to tissues and carries waste products back to the excretory systems for disposal. Consequently, the state of the bloodstream affects or is affected by, many medical conditions. For these reasons, blood tests are the most commonly performed medical tests.

If only a few drops of blood are needed, a fingerstick is performed instead of a venipuncture.

In dwelling arterial, central venous and peripheral venous lines can also be used to draw blood.

Phlebotomists, laboratory practitioners and nurses are those in charge of extracting blood from a patient. However, in special circumstances, and emergency situations, paramedics and physicians extract the blood. Also, respiratory therapists are trained to extract arterial blood to examine arterial blood gases.

Types of tests

Biochemical analysis
A basic metabolic panel measures sodium, potassium, chloride, bicarbonate, blood urea nitrogen (BUN), magnesium, creatinine, glucose, and sometimes calcium. Tests that focus on cholesterol levels can determine LDL and HDL cholesterol levels, as well as triglyceride levels.

Some tests, such as those that measure glucose or a lipid profile, require fasting (or no food consumption) eight to twelve hours prior to the drawing of the blood sample.

For the majority of tests, blood is usually obtained from the patient's vein. Other specialized tests, such as the arterial blood gas test, require blood extracted from an artery. Blood gas analysis of arterial blood is primarily used to monitor carbon dioxide and oxygen levels related to pulmonary function, but is also used to measure blood pH and bicarbonate levels for certain metabolic conditions.

While the regular glucose test is taken at a certain point in time, the glucose tolerance test involves repeated testing to determine the rate at which glucose is processed by the body.

Blood tests are also used to identify autoimmune diseases and Immunoglobulin E-mediated food allergies (see also Radioallergosorbent test).

Normal ranges

Blood tests results should always be interpreted using the ranges provided by the laboratory that performed the test. Example ranges are shown below.

Common abbreviations
Upon completion of a blood test analysis, patients may receive a report with blood test abbreviations. Examples of common blood test abbreviations are shown below.

Molecular profiles
 Protein electrophoresis (general technique—not a specific test)
 Western blot (general technique—not a specific test)
 Liver function tests
 Polymerase chain reaction (DNA). DNA profiling is today possible with even very small quantities of blood: this is commonly used in forensic science, but is now also part of the diagnostic process of many disorders.
 Northern blot (RNA)
 Sexually transmitted diseases

Cellular evaluation
 Full blood count (or "complete blood count")
 Hematocrit
 MCV ("mean corpuscular volume")
 Mean corpuscular hemoglobin concentration (MCHC)
 Erythrocyte sedimentation rate (ESR)
 Cross-matching. Determination of blood type for blood transfusion or transplants
 Blood cultures are commonly taken if infection is suspected. Positive cultures and resulting sensitivity results are often useful in guiding medical treatment.

Future alternatives

Saliva tests
In 2008, scientists announced that the more cost effective saliva testing could eventually replace some blood tests, as saliva contains 20% of the proteins found in blood. Saliva testing may not be appropriate or available for all markers. For example, lipid levels can't be measured with saliva testing.

Microemulsion
In February 2011, Canadian researchers at the University of Calgary's Schulich School of Engineering announced a microchip for blood tests. Dubbed a microemulsion, a droplet of blood captured inside a layer of another substance. It can control the exact size and spacing of the droplets. The new test could improve the efficiency, accuracy, and speed of laboratory tests while also doing it cheaply. The microchip costs $25, whereas the robotic dispensers currently in use cost around $10,000.

SIMBAS
In March 2011, a team of researchers from UC Berkeley, DCU and University of Valparaíso have developed lab-on-a-chip that can diagnose diseases within 10 minutes without the use of external tubing and extra components. It is called Self-powered Integrated Microfluidic Blood Analysis System (SIMBAS). It uses tiny trenches to separate blood cells from plasma (99 percent of blood cells were captured during experiments). Researchers used plastic components, to reduce manufacturing costs.

See also
 Biomarker (medicine), a protein or other biomolecule measured in a blood test
 Blood film, a way to look at blood cells under a microscope
 Blood lead level
 Hematology, the study of blood
 Luminol, a visual test for blood left at crime scenes.
 Schumm test, a common test for blood mismatch
 Barbro Hjalmarsson
 Blood gas test

References